Addedomarus (sometimes written Aθθedomarus on coins) was a king of south-eastern Britain in the late 1st century BC. His name is known only from his inscribed coins, the distribution of which seem to indicate that he was the ruler of the Trinovantes.

Life 
He was the first king to produce inscribed coins north of the Thames, perhaps as early as 35 BC, although some estimates are as late as 15 BC. He seems to have moved the Trinovantian capital from Braughing in Hertfordshire to Camulodunum (Colchester, Essex). For a brief period (ca. 15–10 BC) he seems to have been supplanted by Tasciovanus of the Catuvellauni, who issued coins from Camulodunum at that time. Addedomarus then appears to have regained power and reigned until 10–5 BC, when he was succeeded by Dubnovellaunus. The Lexden Tumulus on the outskirts of Colchester has been suggested as his tomb. His name appears on coinage from 45 BC and 25 BC.

The Welsh Triads recall Aedd Mawr as one of the founders of Britain.

References

Philip de Jersey, Celtic Coinage in Britain, Shire Archaeology, 1996,

External links
Trinovantes at Roman-Britain.co.uk
Trinovantes at Romans in Britain

Briton rulers
1st-century BC rulers in Europe
1st-century BC monarchs in Europe